Cardiff City Ladies Football Club is a Welsh women's football club playing in the English .

History
The club was founded in 1975 as Llanedeyrn L.F.C. after a local charity match. In 1981 the name was changed to Cardiff L.F.C., and in 1993 the club linked up with Inter Cardiff F.C. and started playing at the Cardiff Athletic Stadium. In 1997, the connection with Inter Cardiff was terminated and the club changed its name to Cardiff County L.F.C while affiliating with the Cardiff County Council. In 2001 the club began affiliating with Cardiff City, the professional men’s club from the same city.

At the beginning of the 2003 season, however, the club severed its connection with its male counterpart when its members voted against the men’s club's proposals and its operations became an independent outfit again. Although they were allowed to keep use of the Cardiff City name and kit colours, their crest is very different, and no longer uses the famous moniker 'Bluebirds' , incorporating the Welsh red dragon instead.

In 2006 Cardiff City Ladies won the FA Women's Premier League Southern Division and were promoted to the National Division for the first time. Relegated in the 2007–08 season, the club again were promoted to the National Division in 2010–11.

Because Cardiff City Ladies has won the Welsh Women's Cup, the club has represented Wales played in the UEFA Women's Cup.

Dragons Training Centre 
In 2022 the club opened their youth training centre for girls aged 8-14. 

This was established by manager Jamie Phillip in collaboration with his assistant manager and first team players. The Dragons Training Centre uses the Soccer Profile to measure and track players' progress, enabling them to develop their technical skills. The sessions run at the centre are open to all players regardless of any team affiliation.

The centre is based at the FAW facility, Amdani Hi @ Ocean Way. This is a pioneering hub for women's and girls' football, funded by the FAW.

First-team squad

Former players

Honours
 Welsh Women's Cup (11): 1995, 2003 to 2010, 2012, 2013, 2016

Record in UEFA competitions
2003–04: first qualifying round, 4th
2004–05: first qualifying round, 4th
2005–06: first qualifying round, 3rd
2006–07: first qualifying round, 2nd
2007–08: first qualifying round, 4th
2008–09: first qualifying round, 4th
2009–10: qualifying round, 3rd

References

External links 
 

Football clubs in Cardiff
Association football clubs established in 1975
Women's football clubs in Wales
Welsh football clubs in English leagues
1975 establishments in Wales
FA Women's National League teams